Battle of Écija may refer to:
Battle of Écija (711), see Umayyad conquest of Hispania
Siege of Écija (913), a eunuch named Badr takes the city for Abd-ar-Rahman III
Battle of Écija (1039)
Battle of Écija (1275), Morocco defeated Castile
Cry of Nueva Ecija (1896), a battle of the Philippine Revolution